Events from the year 1981 in Ireland.

Incumbents
 President: Patrick Hillery
 Taoiseach:
 Charles Haughey (FF) (until 30 June 1981)
 Garret FitzGerald (FG) (from 30 June 1981)
 Tánaiste:
 George Colley (FF) (until 30 June 1981)
 Michael O'Leary (Lab) (from 30 June 1981)
 Minister for Finance:
 Gene Fitzgerald (FF) (until 30 June 1981)
 John Bruton (FG) (from 30 June 1981)
 Chief Justice: Tom O'Higgins
 Dáil:
 21st (until 21 May 1981)
 22nd (from 30 June 1981)
 Seanad:
 14th (until 16 July 1981)
 15th (from 8 October 1981)

Events
 6 February – Attacks on shipping in Lough Foyle (1981-1982): Liverpool-registered coal ship Nellie M was bombed and sunk by a Provisional Irish Republican Army unit using a hijacked pilot boat in Lough Foyle.
 14 February – Forty-eight young people died in a fire at the Stardust Ballroom in Artane, Dublin.
 1 March – Bobby Sands began a hunger strike in the Maze Prison (Long Kesh) near Lisburn (Northern Ireland).
 5 March – The petrol strike ended when 800 tanker drivers resumed work.
 10 April – Hunger striker Bobby Sands was elected Member of Parliament (MP) for Fermanagh and South Tyrone in the Parliament of the United Kingdom.
 2 May – Aer Lingus Flight 164, a Boeing 737 en route from Dublin to London was hijacked and ordered to fly to Tehran. The flight was diverted to Paris and the hijacker, Laurence Downey, was arrested.
 5 May – Bobby Sands died on the 66th day of his hunger strike in the Maze Prison.
 12 May – Francis Hughes, previously the most wanted man in Northern Ireland, died on the 59th day of his hunger strike in the Maze Prison.
 21 May – Raymond McCreesh and Patsy O'Hara both died on the 61st day of their hunger strike in the Maze Prison.
 11 June – 1981 Irish general election. Fianna Fáil lost seats and a Fine Gael–Labour Party coalition government was formed. Kieran Doherty, on hunger strike in the Maze Prison, was elected Teachta Dála (TD) for Cavan–Monaghan.
 30 June – Fine Gael leader Garret FitzGerald was elected Taoiseach as the 22nd Dáil Éireann assembled.
 8 July – Provisional Irish Republican Army member Joe McDonnell died on the 61st day of his hunger strike.
 25 July – During a fire at Portlaoise Prison, Irish Army Pte Thomas Metcalfe scaled a forty-foot (12 m) high drainpipe in darkness and rescued a comrade trapped on a blazing rooftop. He later received the Military Medal for Gallantry.
 1 August – Irish National Liberation Army member Kevin Lynch died on the 71st day of his hunger strike in the Maze Prison.
 2 August – Kieran Doherty, TD, died on the 73rd day of his hunger strike in Long Kesh.
 11 September – The Irish Sugar Company announced that it was to close its factory in Tuam, County Galway.
 19 December – Penlee lifeboat disaster: The Arklow-bound, Dublin-registered Union Star was lost on its maiden voyage off Cornwall. Sixteen lives were lost, eight from the Union Star and eight from RNLB Solomon Browne (ON 954) who died while attempting rescue.
 27 December – Supporters of the Society for the Protection of Unborn Children marched in Dublin to demand a referendum for an anti-abortion amendment to the Constitution.
 Undated
 The Irish Green Party was founded as the Ecology Party of Ireland by Dublin teacher Christopher Fettes.

Arts and literature
 4 April – Ireland hosted the Eurovision Song Contest, presented by Doireann Ní Bhriain and aired on RTÉ Television.
 16 August – The first Slane Concert was held at Slane Castle featuring performers Thin Lizzy, Hazel O'Connor, The Bureau, Megahype, Rose Tattoo, Sweet Savage, and U2.
 14 September – Artist and writer Christy Brown was buried in Glasnevin Cemetery, Dublin.
 An association of artists, Aosdána, was established.
 Molly Keane's novel Good Behaviour was published, her first for almost thirty years, and the first under her own name.
 Rita Kelly's poetry Dialann sa Díseart was published.
Neil Jordan was awarded the Rooney Prize for Irish Literature.
 English-born painter Derek Hill donated St. Columb's Rectory, near Churchill, County Donegal (his home since 1954), along with a considerable collection including work by Pablo Picasso, Edgar Degas, Georges Braque, Graham Sutherland and Jack Butler Yeats, to the Irish State.
 A proposed design for a new Áras an Uachtaráin (presidential mansion) was created by Rem Koolhaas, but was never built.

Sport

Association Football
Ireland narrowly missed qualifying for the 1982 World Cup finals in Spain on goal difference.

Gaelic Football
Kerry GAA beat Offaly GAA by 1–12 to 0–8 to win their fourth successive All-Ireland Senior Football Championship.  It was only the third time that a four-in-a-row has been achieved.

Golf
The Irish Open was won by Sam Torrance (Scotland).

Hurling
Offaly GAA won their first All-Ireland Senior Hurling Championship, beating Galway GAA by 2–12 to 0–15 in the final.

Births
1 January – Jonas Armstrong, actor.
26 January – Glen Fitzpatrick, soccer player.
31 January – Dan Connor, soccer player.
12 February – Lisa Hannigan, singer and musician.
13 February – Liam Miller, soccer player (died 2018).
24 February – Brian O'Callaghan, soccer player.
26 February – Ronan Curran, Cork hurler.
3 March – Ger Spillane, Cork Gaelic footballer.
22 March – Brendan McGill, soccer player.
23 March – Colin Cryan, soccer player.
10 April – Des Byrne, soccer player.
18 April – John O'Hara, soccer player.
24 April – Maeve Higgins, comedian.
25 April – Thomas Butler, soccer player.
10 May – Barry Cahill, Dublin Gaelic footballer.
14 June – Dominick Joyce, cricketer.
1 July – Tadhg Kennelly, Gaelic footballer, Australian rules football player.
16 July – Tom Kenny, Cork hurler.
25 July – Fergal Devitt, professional wrestler.
1 August – Stephen Hunt, soccer player.
14 August – Brian Hogan, Kilkenny hurler.
1 September – Niall McCarthy, Cork hurler.
12 September – Philip Hughes, soccer player.
14 September – Glenn Cronin, soccer player.
24 September – Richie Byrne, soccer player.
30 September – Cecelia Ahern, author, daughter of Bertie Ahern.
4 October – Alan Bennett, soccer player.
6 October – Graham Barrett, soccer player.
10 October – Una Healy, singer-songwriter.
12 October – John Thompson, soccer player.
17 October – Steven Gray, soccer player.
24 October – David McGill, soccer player.
8 November – Niall O'Brien, cricketer.
15 November – Kevin Grogan, soccer player.
15 November – Brian Shelley, soccer player.
17 November – Sean Godley, poet.
22 November – Jonathan Douglas, soccer player.
8 December – Aidan Price, soccer player.
29 December – Paul Heffernan, soccer player.

Full date unknown
Derek Hardiman, Galway hurler.
Natasha Nic Gairbheith, 2004 Miss Ireland.
Seán O'Connor, Limerick hurler.
Kevin Tobin, Limerick hurler.
Orla Tobin, 2003 Rose of Tralee winner.

Deaths
1 January – Sir Anthony Esmonde, 15th Baronet, Fine Gael TD and MEP (born 1899).
21 January – Norman Stronge, Ulster Unionist Party politician and Speaker of the Northern Ireland House of Commons for 23 years (born 1894).
8 April – Gretta Bowen, artist (born 1880).
2 May – Tommy Moroney, soccer and rugby player (born 1923).
17 June – Nora Connolly O'Brien, political activist, daughter of James Connolly (born 1892).
2 July – Billy Gillespie, soccer player (born 1891).
7 July – Donal Foley, Irish Times journalist.
21 August – Eddie Byrne, actor (born 1911).
24 August – Jackie Vernon, soccer player (born 1918).
7 September – Christy Brown, author, painter and poet (born 1932).
13 October – Oisín Kelly, sculptor (born 1915).
15 October – James Auchmuty, historian (born 1909).
17 November – Nano Reid, painter (born 1905).
December – Fred Kiernan, soccer player (born 1919).

Full date unknown
Muriel Brandt, painter (born 1909).

See also
1981 in Irish television

References